Petar Klofutar (born 29 July 1893, date of death unknown) was a Slovenian cross-country skier. He competed in the men's 18 kilometre event at the 1928 Winter Olympics.

References

1893 births
Year of death missing
Slovenian male cross-country skiers
Olympic cross-country skiers of Yugoslavia
Cross-country skiers at the 1928 Winter Olympics
People from Kranjska Gora